Rioca is a village in the municipality of Bileća, Republika Srpska, Bosnia and Herzegovina.

Notable people
Mrdak Luburić, participant in the Herzegovina Uprising and a gusle player, father of Andrija Luburić.

References

Villages in Republika Srpska
Populated places in Bileća